The Tongdian is a Chinese institutional history and encyclopedia text. It covers a panoply of topics from high antiquity through the year 756, whereas a quarter of the book focuses on the Tang Dynasty. The book was written by Du You from 766 to 801. It contains 200 volumes and about 1.7 million words, and is at times regarded as the most representative contemporary texts of the Tang Dynasty. Du You also incorporated many materials from other sources, including a book written by his nephew, Du Huan, who was taken captive in the famous battle at the Talas River between Tang and the Arabs in 751 and did not return to China until ten years later. It became a model for works by scholar Zheng Qiao and Ma Duanlin centuries later.

Robert G. Hoyland relates that the Tongdians first draft was a "history of human institutions from earliest times down to the reign of Emperor Xuanzong of Tang", and was subsequently revised as matters continued to evolve. It incorporates parts of the Zhengdian of Liu Zhi and the Great Tang Ritual Regulations of the Kaiyuan Era compiled by Xiao Song, and others in 732. The Tongdian was never included in the canon of the Twenty-Four Histories. It was however quoted extensively in several books which were, starting with the Old Book of Tang.

Content 
 食貨典 Food and commodity
 選舉典 Examination and advancement
 職官典 Government offices
 禮典 Rites
 樂典 Music
 兵典 Military
 刑法典 Penal law
 州郡典 Local administration
 邊防典 Border defense

Notes

References 
 
Wu, Fen and Zeng, Yifen, "Tongdian" ("Comprehensive Institutions"). Encyclopedia of China, 1st ed.
Tongdian 通典 "Comprehensive Statutes"
通典 Full text in Chinese

Chinese encyclopedias
Chinese history texts
8th-century history books
Tang dynasty literature
8th-century Chinese books